Stanić is a South Slavic surname. Notable people with the surname include:

Ana Stanić, Serbian singer
Darko Stanić (born 1978), Serbian handball player
Goran Stanić (born 1972), Macedonian footballer
Jozo Stanić (born 1999), Croatian-German footballer
Krešimir Stanić (born 1985), Swiss footballer of Croatian background
Mario Stanić (born 1972), Croatian footballer
Sreten Stanić (born 1984), Serbian footballer
Vojo Stanić (born 1924), Montenegrin painter and sculptor.

See also
 Stanich

Croatian surnames
Serbian surnames